Lesnovo may refer to:

Lesnovo, Sofia Province, a village in central-western Bulgaria, part of Elin Pelin Municipality, Sofia Province
Lesnovo, North Macedonia, a village in North Macedonia, near Probištip
 Lesnovo monastery, North Macedonia

See also
Leśnowo